Kumarason Chinnadurai (born 10 August 1968, in Singapore), popularly known as Kumar, is a Singaporean Indian comedian and television host, actor, and drag queen. He made his name at the Boom Boom Room and was, for a time, synonymous with the cabaret nightclub as its resident performer. Having spent nearly two decades as an entertainer, he has amassed a string of television, stage, and film credits. Currently, he is a regular performer at Hard Rock Café. He released his biographical book, Kumar: From Rags To Drag, in September 2011. In his book, he publicly came out as gay, making him the first entertainer in Singapore to come out. He is one of the few openly-gay public figures in Singapore.

Early life
Kumar was born on 10 August 1968 in a South Indian Mudaliar family from Madras and a Singaporean mother. His father, Chinna Dorai, arrived in Singapore in the mid-1960s and worked as a caretaker for the Society for the Prevention of Cruelty to Animals (SPCA). When Kumar was four, his parents divorced; he was raised by his mother's younger sister, Rani Vyarakannoo, a policewoman, who eventually became his step-mother.

Kumar grew up in a terrace house on Paterson Road with his parents, three siblings – three older sisters, and six dogs. He went to Cairnhill and Selegie Primary schools and later attended Monk's Hill Secondary School. As a child, he aspired to be a classical Bharathanatyam dancer and joined the Indian Dance Society in his secondary school. After his O levels, Kumar worked for six months as a cashier at a convenience store before enlisting for National Service, where he served as a combat signaler in the army and held the record for one of the fastest times in his cohort for the completion of the 2.4 km run.

Stand Up Comedy
In 1987, after serving his conscription, Kumar had his first exposure to the entertainment industry at 22 years old as a singing waiter at Cheers! The Fun Pub at the Novotel Orchid. Two years later, he began a stint as an entertainer at Haw Par Villa. In 1991, Kumar landed a gig at the now defunct Laughs Comedy Club in Tanglin Shopping Centre playing the role of an Indian drag queen. It was then when he realized comedy was his calling.

Kumar's big break came in 1992 when he was offered the starring role at the newly established Boom Boom Room in New Bugis Street which opened on National Day the same year. At Boom Boom Room, Kumar's routines included song and dance, in addition to stand-up comedy. He wrote most of his own material and had initially started with clean jokes which proved unpopular, drawing chilly responses from his audience; that led him to go with more risqué ones for which he is now known. His cross-dressing which came about as a comic device and a gimmick eventually became his trademark as he came to be Singapore's most well-known drag queen with his caustic wit and biting observations about life in Singapore, particularly about politics, race, and sex. Because of the provocative nature of his shows, Kumar's performances were subjected to scrutiny and monitoring by the police. Once a year, he had to perform his entire show for an audience of police officers before he was allowed to put it up for the public.

After moving to Far East Square in 2000, Boom Boom Room closed permanently in 2004. Kumar started performing at a theatre-bar called Gold Dust (of which he was part-owner) in Orchard Towers. In 2007, he sold his share of the club and has since been performing three nights a week at 3-Monkeys Café.

Kumar was also a regular performer at Chameleon Lounge Club on Dempsey Road.

Television 
Kumar made his television debut in 1993 as one of the three hosts of The Ra Ra Show, a comedy chat show which started airing in April 1993. The show proved to be short-lived and ended its run after ten months when viewers complained about the liberal use of Singlish and perceived sexual innuendoes in the show. It would be eight years before he returned to television, starring opposite Hong Kong actress Carol Cheng in the English sitcom, Oh Carol!, in 2001.

Since then, Kumar has appeared in various English television programs such as My Sassy Neighbour and Front; he also hosted three seasons of Rusiyo Rusi, a travelogue cooking show, and played the titular character in the crime comedy series P.I.K. (Private Investigator Krish) on Vasantham Central. One of the most salient differences between Kumar's appearances on television and his shows in clubs is that he does not perform in drag on television.

Stage/Theatre 
Kumar's first foray into theatre was in 1997 when he was offered a role in Dick Lee’s musical, Hot Pants. This was quickly followed by Kumar: A Life Alive, a comedy musical based on his own journey to stardom. His other stage credits include Meena and Me (1999), ABUSE SUXXX!!! (2001), and Not Guilty (2004).

Kumar has also taken his stand-up comedy to the stage, putting up a number of one-man shows both abroad and at home, such as his performance at Wallpaper* magazine’s first anniversary party in London, and, at home, a semi-annual series of shows produced by Dream Academy, from Kumar The Queen (2007), Crazy Christmas (annual), Kumar: Stripped Bare & Standing up (2009-2010), Kumar’s Amazing Race (2011-2012), Kings and Queens of Asia (2011-2012) by Comedy Club Asia and Kumar: What makes a man a man? (2013-2014).

Filmography
Kumar has been increasingly sought after on the silver screen. His latest major role was as Minister of Toilets, Kumari Kuppusamy in Everybody's Business (2013). He also played mother to Vernon in One Leg Kicking (2001).

Personal life

From childhood, Kumar had dressed at home as a girl.  When his parents discovered him cross-dressing as an adult for his work, his father did not speak to him for seven years, and his mother thought he was a prostitute.  Due to transgender discrimination in Singapore, it is common for trans women to work as prostitutes.

While he first came out to fans as gay in his 2009 performance Kumar: Stripped Bare and Standing Up, Kumar made it official in his 2011 biography. Kumar has hinted at his sexual orientation and gender identity through his comedy routines and televised interviews. He has stated that he is "half man half woman", that he is "more woman than man", and that he has been called out by children as transgender. In Singaporean culture, the "drag queen" identity falls under the transgender umbrella, and a scholar from the National University of Singapore noted that Kumar was the first transgender celebrity to serve as an ambassador to the annual LGBT Pride event in Singapore called Pink Dot.

As of 2023, same sex marriages are still illegal but sex between consenting male adults are now legal.

See also 
 Transgender people in Singapore

References

External links 
 
 KumarSutra.com

1968 births
Living people
Singaporean LGBT people
Singaporean entertainers
Singaporean people of Tamil descent
Singaporean people of Indian descent
Gay comedians
Gay actors